Antônio Dias dos Santos (June 7, 1948 in Vera Cruz, Bahia State, Brazil – December 8, 1999), best known as Toninho, was an association footballer in defender role.

In career (1968–1982) played for clubs São Cristovão-BA, Galícia, Fluminense, Flamengo, Bangu and in Saudi Arabia with Al-Nassr. He won five Campeonato Carioca (1971, 1973, 1975, 1978, 1979) and one Campeonato Brasileiro Série A in 1980 and one Saudi League and King Cup in 1981.

For the Brazil national football team he played 26 international matches and scored 3 goals from April 1976 to October 1979, and participated at 1978 FIFA World Cup, without scoring goals. He died at only 51 years old.

References

External links

1948 births
1999 deaths
Brazilian footballers
Brazil international footballers
Brazilian expatriate footballers
Association football defenders
Campeonato Brasileiro Série A players
Fluminense FC players
CR Flamengo footballers
Al Nassr FC players
Expatriate footballers in Saudi Arabia
Bangu Atlético Clube players
1978 FIFA World Cup players
1979 Copa América players
Saudi Professional League players
Brazilian expatriate sportspeople in Saudi Arabia